Several ships have been named Duchess of Rutland (or Dutchess of Rutland) for one of the Duchesses of Rutland.

  was launched in Dublin. She carried passengers between England and Ireland. In 1793 she apparently transferred to Liverpool and sailed from there as a West Indiaman. She was on a voyage to Barbados when a French privateer captured her in 1797.
  was launched in Sweden in 1786 under another name. She was taken in prize in 1799 and thereafter served as a transport. French frigates captured and burnt her on 4 February 1805 as she was sailing in convoy from Malta to London.

Ship names